James Augustus Black (1793 – April 3, 1848) was a slave owner, manufacturer, cotton broker, and U.S. Representative from South Carolina.

Early life and military service
Black was born on his father's plantation in the Ninety-Six District, near Abbeville, South Carolina. He attended the common schools on his father's plantation.

Black served in the army during the War of 1812. He was appointed a second lieutenant in the Eighth Infantry on March 12, 1812. He was promoted to first lieutenant on December 2, 1813. After the war, Black was honorably discharged (June 15, 1815).

Early career and a taste for politics
Soon after returning to civilian life, Black co-founded the Kings Mountain Iron Works, which was involved in the mining of iron ore in areas near present-day Cherokee Falls, South Carolina.

Black eventually moved to Georgia, settling in Savannah, where he engaged in the buying and selling of cotton. Black served as tax collector of Chatham County, Georgia for a time, before he returned to South Carolina.

Political career
This time, Black settled in Columbia, where he worked for a time as a cashier of the State Bank branch. He ran for, and twice won, a seat in the South Carolina House of Representatives, serving from 1826 to 1828; and again, 1832–1835.

Beginning in 1843, Black, a Democrat, was elected to three consecutive terms (the Twenty-eighth, Twenty-ninth, and Thirtieth) United States Congresses. Black was chairman of the Committee on the Militia during the Mexican–American War.

Death
Black served in Congress from March 4, 1843, until his death April 3, 1848 in Washington, D.C. while still in office. He is interred in the graveyard of the First Presbyterian Church, Columbia, South Carolina. A cenotaph in his honor was erected at the Congressional Cemetery.

See also
List of United States Congress members who died in office (1790–1899)

References

Sources

External links
James Augustus Black entry at The Political Graveyard
 and cenotaph at the Congressional Cemetery

Date of birth unknown
1793 births
1848 deaths
United States Army personnel of the War of 1812
Burials in South Carolina
Democratic Party members of the South Carolina House of Representatives
People from Abbeville, South Carolina
Tax collectors
United States Army officers
Democratic Party members of the United States House of Representatives from South Carolina
19th-century American politicians